Vitali Nikolayevich Novopashin (born September 28, 1978) is a Kazakhstani former professional ice hockey defenceman who last played for Atlant Moscow Oblast of the Kontinental Hockey League (KHL).

Novopashin previously spent the majority of his career with Torpedo Nizhny Novgorod and has also played for Salavat Yulaev Ufa, Metallurg Novokuznetsk and Barys Astana.

External links

1978 births
Living people
Atlant Moscow Oblast players
Barys Nur-Sultan players
Kazzinc-Torpedo players
Metallurg Novokuznetsk players
Kazakhstani ice hockey defencemen
Salavat Yulaev Ufa players
Torpedo Nizhny Novgorod players
Sportspeople from Oskemen
Expatriate ice hockey players in Russia
Asian Games gold medalists for Kazakhstan
Medalists at the 1999 Asian Winter Games
Medalists at the 2011 Asian Winter Games
Ice hockey players at the 1999 Asian Winter Games
Ice hockey players at the 2011 Asian Winter Games
Asian Games medalists in ice hockey